The Maryland Center for History and Culture  (MCHC), formerly the Maryland Historical Society (MdHS),  founded on March 1, 1844, is the oldest cultural institution in the U.S. state of Maryland. The organization "collects, preserves, and interprets objects and materials reflecting Maryland's diverse heritage".  The MCHC has a museum, library, holds educational programs, and publishes scholarly works on Maryland.

History
The campus of the Maryland Center for History and Culture is located in the neighborhood of Baltimore, Maryland at 610 Park Avenue. This location is the main building of the MCHC, which has been housed at the Enoch Pratt House since 1919. The organization changed its name from the "Maryland Historical Society" to the "Maryland Center for History and Culture" in September 2020 shortly after celebrating its 175th anniversary.

The Enoch Pratt House was originally built in 1847 and was presented to MdHS in 1916 by Ms. Mary Washington Keyser as a tribute to her husband, H. Irvine Keyser who was a member of MdHS from 1835 until his death in 1916. Enoch Pratt (1806-1896) is a well known philanthropist who created the Enoch Pratt Free Library and gave substantial contributions to the First Unitarian Church of Baltimore, the Maryland Science Center, and the Maryland School for the Deaf.

The MCHC Today

Journal
The MCHC has published a quarterly journal, now entering completing its 103rd year. The Maryland Historical Magazine is a peer-reviewed journal boasting one of the largest readerships among state historical organization journals.  The organization also publishes books on Maryland history that are distributed through a partnership with the Johns Hopkins University Press, including Crime and Punishment in Early Maryland written by former MdHS librarian Raphael Semmes (1890-1952). The MCHC has over 100 titles in the Library of Congress.

Exhibitions
Notables on exhibit at the MCHC are the original manuscript of "The Star-Spangled Banner" and the letters and journals of Benjamin Banneker. The MCHC showcases include 231 weapons, 866 pieces of jewelry, 2,200 Native American prehistoric archaeological objects, 15,000 musical scores as well as a remarkable collection of 18th- and 19th-century paintings and silver, maritime artifacts, Maryland painted and inlaid furniture, quilts, costumes, ceramics, dolls and toys. Exhibits include Maryland's history, Maryland in art and furniture in Maryland life.

Library
The H. Furlong Baldwin Library’s collections are both diverse and substantive. The library enables researchers, teachers, and students to see for themselves the records of the past, and to study and learn from its many treasures. The library’s collections include 60,000 books, 800,000 photographs, 5 million manuscripts, 6,500 prints and broadsides, 1 million pieces of printed ephemera, extensive genealogy indexes, and more, reflecting the history of Maryland and its people. These collections are accessible to visitors on-line and at the MCHC campus in Baltimore.

In 1968 the library acquired 80 photographs by Bert Sadler, noted for his work in capturing everyday American life.

On July 9, 2011, Barry Landau and Jason Savedoff were arrested and later indicted for the theft of 60 society documents.

Preserve the Baltimore Uprising 
The MCHC is a community partner of Preserve the Baltimore Uprising, a digital archive devoted to preserving and making accessible media created and captured by people and organizations involved in or witness to the protests following Freddie Gray's death in 2015. The 2016-2017 MdHS exhibit What & Why: Collecting at the Maryland Historical Society included items from the Preserve the Baltimore Uprising collections in a video installation.

See also
List of maritime museums in the United States

Notes

Further reading
"Tradition and Generosity" (special issue). Maryland Historical Magazine. 101, 4. Winter 2006. 467-203.
"H. Irvine Keyser". Historical Marker Database Accessed November 21, 2008.
"Enoch Pratt House". Historical Marker Database. Accessed November 21, 2008.
"Publications". Maryland Historical Society. Accessed November 21, 2008.

External links

Maryland Historical Markers photographs at the University of Maryland Libraries

Historical societies in Maryland
Museums in Baltimore
Art museums and galleries in Maryland
History museums in Maryland
1844 establishments in Maryland
State historical societies of the United States
Mount Vernon, Baltimore